Vincent Léopold Edouard Ramus (born 4 April 1868, date of death unknown) was a French fencer. He competed in the individual foil masters event at the 1900 Summer Olympics, finishing 6th.

References

External links
 

1868 births
Year of death missing
French male foil fencers
Olympic fencers of France
Fencers at the 1900 Summer Olympics
Sportspeople from Lyon Metropolis
Place of death missing